Kanayama Station is the name of three train stations in Japan.

 Kanayama Station (Aichi) in Nagoya, Aichi Prefecture
 Kanayama Station (Fukuoka) in Fukuoka, Fukuoka Prefecture
 Kanayama Station (Hokkaido) in Sorachi District, Hokkaido

See also
 Kanayama-cho Station in Naka-ku, Hiroshima
 Shimo-Kanayama Station in Minamifurano, Hokkaido